The R.E. Hoy No. 1 Oil Well was constructed by the Sinclair Oil & Refining Corporation in September 1916. It has been listed on the National Register of Historic Places since 1986. Milton C. Garber and his brother Bert Garber hired geologist Dorsey Hager to determine potential drilling locations on their properties. The Garber brothers contracted Harry F. Sinclair to construct a well on R. E. Hoy's farm (NE corner, Section 25, T22N, R4W,
Garfield County). The well was drilled at a depth of 1,130–56 feet. The Hoy sand was the first successful sand of the Garber-Covington oil field, and the first well to be drilled with the advice of a geologist. From 1916 to 1940 the well utilized primary production, adding secondary methods of gas injection (1941 to 1948) and waterflooding (since 1948). At the time of nomination, the Hoy well was producing , and had been in operation for 69 years.

References

Industrial buildings and structures on the National Register of Historic Places in Oklahoma
Buildings and structures in Garfield County, Oklahoma
Sinclair Oil Corporation
Energy infrastructure completed in 1916
Oil wells in Oklahoma
National Register of Historic Places in Garfield County, Oklahoma
Oil wells on the National Register of Historic Places